Jackson Gross (born November 4, 1978) is an Aruban football player. He made four appearances on the Aruba national team from 1996–2000.

References

1978 births
Living people
Aruban footballers
Association football defenders
SV Britannia players
Aruba international footballers